Anne Dawson is an English academic, formerly a broadcast journalist and television presenter.

Journalism career
After studying English at university, Salisbury-born Dawson began her career as a trainee journalist at a local newspaper before joining BBC South Today in Southampton as a production journalist, reporter and presenter. She also worked for the South East edition of TVS's regional news programme Coast to Coast, as a district reporter in Brighton and later, Maidstone.

In January 1989, Dawson became a main presenter of the then-new Central News South service for the South Midlands, alongside Wesley Smith. The presenting duo became the longest-serving partnership in ITV regional news. As well as presenting Central News South, she presented non-news regional programmes including Lifeline, Central Post and Heart of the Country (as a reporter).

Teaching career
In 2001, Dawson turned down a presenting role on the ITV News Channel with a view to presenting national news bulletins on ITV1. A year later, she left Central News South and began training as a teacher, during which, she taught English Literature in several secondary schools.

Dawson is now Head of Media School and lectures in Journalism at the University of Gloucestershire, based at the Park Campus studios in Cheltenham.

References

Year of birth missing (living people)
People from Salisbury
Living people
ITV regional newsreaders and journalists
Academics of the University of Gloucestershire